Justice Lyman may refer to:

Daniel Lyman, chief justice of the Rhode Island Supreme Court
Frank H. Lyman, associate justice of the Arizona Supreme Court